Talembika is a village in the Zam Department of Ganzourgou Province in central Burkina Faso.  The village has a population of 1429.

References

Populated places in the Plateau-Central Region
Ganzourgou Province